Kirsty Ann Blackman (born 20 March 1986) is a Scottish National Party (SNP) politician serving as the Member of Parliament (MP) for Aberdeen North since 2015.

Blackman was re-elected in 2017 and 2019 and currently serves as the SNP Spokesperson for the Cabinet Office. She was previously the SNP Spokesperson for the Treasury from 2017 to 2019, the SNP Deputy Westminster Leader from 2017 to 2020, and the SNP Spokesperson for Work and Pensions from March to December 2022.

Early life
Blackman was educated at Robert Gordon's College after winning a scholarship. She matriculated at the University of Aberdeen to study medicine, but later dropped out.

She first entered politics when she was elected to Aberdeen City Council as an SNP councillor in the Hilton/Stockethill ward, in the Aberdeen North constituency in the 2007 Aberdeen City Council election topping the poll in her ward with 1,761 first preferences. Her brother, John West, was also elected for the Hazlehead/Ashley/Queens Cross ward in the same election. She was re-elected in 2012 Aberdeen City Council election with 823 first preferences taking the second seat in the ward She then became the Convener of the SNP group in Aberdeen City Council.

Parliamentary career
At the 2015 general election, she became the Member of Parliament for Aberdeen North. She succeeded Frank Doran, of the Labour Party, who had announced in October 2013 that he would stand down at the next general election. She won the seat with 24,793 votes, 13,396 more than the Labour Party candidate Richard Baker, and became SNP Spokesperson on the House of Lords. In April 2016, she drew attention to the plight of unaccompanied refugee children during a Commons debate. She was elected to the Scottish Affairs Committee in 2015. In July 2016, she spoke out on the importance of making Parliament more family-friendly after being censured by clerks for holding her sleeping two-year-old daughter in a committee hearing.

She retained her seat at the 2017 general election. Following the election, she became Deputy Leader of the SNP Westminster Group and SNP Westminster Spokesperson on the Economy. This made her the first woman to lead on the economy for a major party in the House of Commons.

Blackman held the seat at the 2019 general election with a majority of 33.9%, the largest percentage majority in Scotland. In January 2019, she became the SNP Spokesperson for the Constitution at Westminster, a strategic role leading on the constitution in preparation for an independence referendum.

In July 2020 Blackman announced that she would be stepping down as the deputy leader of the SNP Westminster Group, saying "Like many others, I've struggled with the impact that lockdown has had on my mental health. In order to prioritise my constituency and my family, I have made the difficult personal decision to step down from my Leadership role. I strongly believe that people must be able to talk openly about mental health issues, which affect so many of us". On 7 July it was announced that Kirsten Oswald was to be her successor. On 24 September 2020 she spoke more about suffering with depression.

In January 2021, Blackman publicly criticised former party leader Alex Salmond, labelling him an "awful human".

In February 2021, Blackman clashed on Twitter with fellow MP Joanna Cherry about transgender rights.

In November 2021, Blackman wrote a tweet on benefit sanctions that was thought to make a political point while referencing the suicide of the wife of the Conservative MP Owen Paterson. Rose Paterson committed suicide by hanging in June 2020. She later tweeted “After some reflection, I have deleted a tweet I made earlier. I offer my unreserved apologies for tweeting it, particularly to anyone who may have been upset or offended. I’m sorry”.

In May 2022, Chancellor Rishi Sunak introduced a windfall tax on the soaring profits of energy companies to pay for a series of measures that would help people with the cost of living crisis. Blackman complained to the BBC that, “It feels very unfair that Scotland is having to pay for the entirety of the UK” as most of the tax revenue came from oil and gas “income made in Scotland”. The remarks led to some debate about the nature of pooling and sharing of resources and Alistair Carmichael opined in The Scotsman that, "There is nothing progressive about saying that families in England, Wales and Northern Ireland must go cold and hungry because nationalism says that we should keep oil money here in Scotland."

References

External links

 profile at the Scottish National Party website

 

|-

1986 births
21st-century Scottish women politicians
21st-century Scottish politicians
Councillors in Aberdeen
Female members of the Parliament of the United Kingdom for Scottish constituencies
Living people
Members of the Parliament of the United Kingdom for Aberdeen constituencies
People educated at Robert Gordon's College
Scottish National Party councillors
Scottish National Party MPs
UK MPs 2015–2017
UK MPs 2017–2019
UK MPs 2019–present
Women councillors in Scotland